Malcolm Cross was a Scotland international rugby union player.

Rugby Union career

Amateur career

He played for Merchistonians.

Provincial career

Cross was capped by Glasgow District to play against Edinburgh District in the inter-city match.

He was selected and played in the Blues Trial side of 1878.

He played for West of Scotland District in March 1879.

International career

Family

He was the brother of William Cross who was also capped for Scotland, and who scored the first ever conversion in international rugby.

References

Sources

 Bath, Richard (ed.) The Scotland Rugby Miscellany (Vision Sports Publishing Ltd, 2007 )

1856 births
1919 deaths
Rugby union players from Glasgow
Scottish rugby union players
Scotland international rugby union players
Glasgow Academicals rugby union players
Glasgow District (rugby union) players
Blues Trial players
Presidents of the Scottish Rugby Union
West of Scotland District (rugby union) players
Rugby union three-quarters